USS Hamlin (CVE-15) was one of a large group of escort aircraft carriers built on Maritime Commission C-3 hulls and transferred to the Royal Navy under Lend Lease during World War II. The ship was launched by Western Pipe and Steel Company, San Francisco, California, on 5 March 1942, as AVG-15, aircraft escort vessel. She was sponsored by Mrs. William H. Shea. Her designation was changed to ACV-15, auxiliary aircraft carrier, 20 August 1942, and she was acquired and simultaneously transferred to the United Kingdom 21 December 1942. Hamlins designation was changed to CVE-15, escort aircraft carrier, 15 July 1943.

Renamed HMS Stalker (D91), the escort carrier played a vital part in allied operations in the Atlantic. She participated in the Salerno landings in September 1943, providing effective on the spot air support for assault forces. Stalker also took part in the important landings in southern France in August 1944. From March to April 1945 she was attached to the 21st Aircraft Carrier Squadron. Returned to the United States 29 December 1945, she was struck from the Navy Register 20 March 1946 and sold to Waterman Steamship Corp. of Mobile, Alabama, 18 December 1946. Waterman in turn sold her to the Netherlands in August 1947 where she was converted to the merchant ship Riouw.  Later renamed Lobito in 1968, she was scrapped in Taiwan in September 1975.

Design and description
There were eight s in service with the Royal Navy during the Second World War. They were built between 1941 and 1942 by Ingalls Shipbuilding and Western Pipe & Steel shipyards in the United States, both building four ships each.

The ships had a complement of 646 men and accommodation of Royal Navy mess hall control food. The separate messes no longer had to prepare their own food, as everything was cooked in the galley and served cafeteria style in a central dining area. They were also equipped with a modern laundry and a barber shop. The traditional hammocks were replaced by three tier bunk beds, eighteen to a cabin which were hinged and could be tied up to provide extra space when not in use.

Aircraft facilities were a small combined bridge–flight control on the starboard side and above the  flight deck, two aircraft lifts , and nine arrestor wires. Aircraft could be housed in the  hangar below the flight deck. Armament comprised two 4"/50, 5"/38 or 5"/51  in single mounts, eight 40 mm anti-aircraft gun in twin mounts and twenty-one 20 mm guns anti-aircraft cannons in single or twin mounts. They had the capacity for up to eighteen aircraft which could be a mixture of Grumman Martlet, Hawker Sea Hurricane, Seafire, Vought F4U Corsair fighter aircraft and Fairey Swordfish or Grumman Avenger anti-submarine aircraft.

References

Bibliography

External links

 

Type C3-S-A2 ships of the Royal Navy
Attacker-class escort carriers
Ships built in San Francisco
1942 ships
World War II aircraft carriers of the United Kingdom